Frances E. Boyd Dawson was a British social activist.

Born Frances E. Dawson, she was living in Lancaster in 1904, when she joined the Independent Labour Party.  She qualified as a sanitary inspector, and moved to Reading, Berkshire, where she was a founder member of the local Fabian Society in 1906.  She also became the secretary of the Reading Women's Suffrage Society, and delivered lectures for the National Committee for the Prevention of Destitution.

Known as Mrs Boyd Dawson after her marriage, she was a founder member of the Fabian Women's Group.  She later relocated to London, undertaking research for the Ministry of Labour.  She was also secretary of the Household Corps, and spent two years as secretary of the Women's Industrial Council.  From 1919, she served on the executive of the Fabian Society.

References

Year of birth missing
Year of death missing
Members of the Fabian Society
People from Lancaster, Lancashire